Antti Ilmari Lindtman (born 11 August 1982) is a Finnish politician from the Social Democratic Party. He has been the chairman of the city council of Vantaa since 2009 and a member of the Parliament of Finland for Uusimaa since April 2011. In April 2015, he was elected as the chairman of the Social Democratic Parliamentary Group.

In October 2016, it was found out that Lindtman had handed secret lists to the speakers of the Parliament in which he had suggested which MPs from the SDP should get turns to speak in plenary sessions. The speakers had been under the impression that the lists were the result of an internal agreement of the parliamentary group, whereas Lindtman had made the decision alone and without informing anyone else. The practice had continued for at least a year. The revelation led to heavy criticism of Lindtman's actions by the members of the parliamentary group, after which Lindtman apologized for his actions.

Lindtman came out in support of the legislative reforms arising from the Oulu child sexual exploitation scandal.

Lindtman came in second in a vote to replace Social Democratic leader Antti Rinne in December 2019 after his resignation, narrowly losing to Transportation Minister Sanna Marin.

References 

1982 births
Living people
People from Vantaa
Social Democratic Party of Finland politicians
Members of the Parliament of Finland (2011–15)
Members of the Parliament of Finland (2015–19)
Members of the Parliament of Finland (2019–23)